Myolepta dubia is a European hoverfly.

References

Eristalinae
Muscomorph flies of Europe
Insects described in 1805
Taxa named by Johan Christian Fabricius